Hebron Township may refer to:

 Hebron Township, McHenry County, Illinois
 Hebron Township, Kossuth County, Iowa
 Hebron Township, Michigan
 Hebron Township, Williams County, North Dakota, in Williams County, North Dakota
 Hebron Township, Potter County, Pennsylvania

Township name disambiguation pages